Shoma Anand (born 16 February 1958) is an Indian film and television actress. She started her career opposite Rishi Kapoor in Pramod Chakraborty's romantic-crime movie Barood, then played a role in Patita, produced and directed by the same person. She had a few other films in which she was the lead, such as Jagir and Coolie in the 1980s. From the late 1990s to present, she has played supporting roles in films like Jaise Karani Waisi Bharani, Coolie, Hungama, Kyaa Kool Hai Hum and Kal Ho Naa Ho.

She also acted in television series like Bhabhi, sitcom Hum Paanch and Shararat. She has also worked in Punjabi movies over the years.

She was married to actor Tariq Shah and they have a daughter, Sarah.

Television
 Hum Paanch ... as Bina Mathur
 Maal Hai To Taal Hai
 Kitne Kool Hai Hum
 Bhabhi ... as Reshma
 Shararat ... as Shanti Saberwal
 Maayka ... as Durga Khurana (Jeet & Veer's mother, Soni's mother-in-law)
 Gili Gili Gappa ... as children's Grand mother
 Jeannie Aur Juju ... as Vicky's Mom
 Khelti Hai Zindagi Aankh Micholi ... as Prabha
Y.A.R.O Ka Tashan as Daadi Cool

Filmography

Dukh Bhanjan Tera Naam (1974) in Punjabi Movie...as Rajni's sister
Barood (1976)... Seema Bakshi
Azaad (1978 film)... Rekha Sharma 
Prem Jaal (1979)
Aarattu (1979 film) Malayalam (1979)Patita (1980)... Rajni Aap Ke Deewane (1980)... Meena Judaai (1980)... Manisha R. Narayan Kaaran (1981) Khara Khota  (1981)... Sangeeta Jwala Dahej Ki (1983)Jeena Hai Pyar Mein (1983)Afsana Do Dil Ka (1983)Himmatwala (1983)... Champa Hum Se Na Jeeta Koi (1983)... Sudha Paanchwin Manzil (1983)...KavitaCoolie (1983)... Deepa Iyengar Main Awara Hoon (1983)...Shabana RaashidBindiya Chamkegi (1984)Ghar Ek Mandir (1984)... SapnaJagir (1984)... Asha Shaan (1985)Salma (1985)... MumtazHum Do Hamare Do (1985)Ghar Dwar (1985)... ChandaPataal Bhairavi (1985)Mehak (1985)Aaj Ka Daur (1985)... Sharda KapoorQatil Aur Ashiq (1986)Aag Aur Shola (1986)... Lakshmi (Usha's Elder Sister)Swarag Se Sunder (1986)Nafrat (1987)Jaago Hua Savera (1987)Ghar Ka Sukh (1987)Sitapur Ki Geeta (1987)... Pinky SrivastavKhooni Mahal (1987)... ReenaSaat Bijliyan (1988)Aurat Teri Yehi Kahani (1988)Dariya Dil (1988)... SapnaPyaar Ka Mandir (1988)... SapnaCharanon Ki Saugandh (1988) ..... GeetaBade Ghar Ki Beti (1989)... Manohar's WifeJaisi Karni Waisi Bharni (1989)... Sapna KumarDaata (1989)... AlkaInsaaf Ka Khoon (1991)Karz Chukana Hai (1991)... SapnaGhar Parivar (1991)Naseeb Wala (1992)... Rita (Ashok's Wife)Dhartiputra (1993)..... MeenabaiProfessar Ki Padosan (1994)... Professor's MenkaPyaar Koi Khel Nahin (1999)Shaadi Karke Phas Gaya Yaar (2002) ... JudgeHungama (2003)... Mrs. Anjali TiwariKal Ho Naa Ho (2003)... Lajjo Kapur's SisterThoda Tum Badlo Thoda Hum (2004)Kyaa Kool Hai Hum (2005)... Dr. Screwwala's WifeBhaggmati - The Queen Of Fortunes (2005)Love Ke Chakkar Mein (2006)... KaajalLife Partner (2009)... Mrs. Darshan Manibhai PatelLad Geya Pecha (2010)... Teej Kaur (Baljit's Mother)Asa Mee Ashi Tee (2013) (Marathi film)Familywala'' (2014)

References

Shoma Anand profile

External links
 

Indian film actresses
Living people
1958 births
Indian soap opera actresses
Actresses in Hindi television